The Kilamuwa scepter or Kilamuwa sheath is an 9th-century BCE small gold object inscribed in Phoenician or Aramaic, which was found during the excavations of Zincirli in 1943. It was found in burned debris in a corridor at the front of the "Building of Kilamuwa".

King Kilamuwa is believed to have ruled in the area of Zincirli in ca. 830 - 820 BC.

The object measures 6.7 x 2.2 cm, and is ornamented with soldered gold wire and gold plates; two of the rectangular plates are inscribed with a total of seven lines or writing. Felix von Luschan concluded that it was once on the handle (or sheath) of a staff or scepter.

Text
The text as presented by Dupont-Sommer is as follows.

The text may be read as follows.

Bibliography
Editio princeps: Felix von Luschan, Die Kleinfunde von Sendschirli . Herausgabe und Ergänzung besorgt von Walter Andrae (Mitteilungen aus den orientalischen Sammlungen, Heft XV; Berlin 1943) 102, Abb. 124, Tf. 47f-g (the book was reviewed by K. Galline; in BiOr 5 fl948] 115–120).
Dupont-Sommer, A. “Une Inscription Nouvelle Du Roi Kilamou et Le Dieu Rekoub-El” Revue de l’histoire Des Religions 133, no. 1/3 (1947): 19–33
Galling, Kurt. “The Scepter of Wisdom: A Note on the Gold Sheath of Zendjirli and Ecclesiastes 12: 11” Bulletin of the American Schools of Oriental Research, no. 119 (1950): 15–18. https://doi.org/10.2307/3218799
Swiggers, P. “The Aramaic Inscription of Kilamuwa” Orientalia 51, no. 2 (1982): 249–53.

References

Phoenician inscriptions
Archaeological artifacts